Tropical Ranch Botanical Garden is a small botanical garden, located at 1905 SW Ranch Trail, in Stuart, Florida. It is the only botanical garden in Martin County, and is open to the public free of charge. The gardens are located on the property of Diane Rexroad and Jim Haines, the founders and current owners and operators of the Garden. They first opened their gardens to the public in May 2006, out of a desire to educate people in home landscaping and horticulture, in accordance with the University of Florida's Florida Friendly Landscaping Program.  In the management of the Garden, Rexroad and Haines use environmentally friendly practices such as proper fertilizing and mulching, attracting wildlife, controlling yard pests with integrated pest management strategies, water conservation, and the reduction stormwater runoff. They also promote the use of these garden management practices in home landscapes.

Rare and unusual plants are displayed throughout Tropical Ranch Botanical Garden in nine themed garden areas, each with distinctive plant specimens and landscaping style.

Tropical Ranch Botanical Gardens is maintained by the owners and a staff of volunteers.

See also
List of botanical gardens in Florida
List of botanical gardens in the United States

References

Botanical gardens in Florida
Martin County, Florida